Saint-Pont is a commune in the Allier department in Auvergne-Rhône-Alpes in central France. The poet Alain Borne (1915–1962), winner of the 1954 Prix Antonin-Artaud was born in Saint-Pont.

Population

See also
Communes of the Allier department

References

Communes of Allier
Allier communes articles needing translation from French Wikipedia